"Prisencolinensinainciusol" (stylized on the single cover as "PRİSENCÓLİNENSİNÁİNCIÚSOL") is a song composed by the Italian singer Adriano Celentano, and performed by Celentano and his wife Claudia Mori. It was released as a single in 1972. Both the name of the song and its lyrics are gibberish but are intended to sound like English in an American accent.

Background 
By the 1960s, Celentano was already one of the most popular rock musicians in Italy, in large part due to his appearance at the Sanremo Music Festival in 1960 and the subsequent success of his song "24.000 baci". Martina Tanga writes that his artistic persona was characterised by "loud lyrics and inelegant body movements", which differentiated him from other singers of the time. Paolo Prato describes his style as "a bit of Elvis, a bit of Jerry Lewis, a bit of folk singer". "Prisencolinensinainciusol" was released in 1972 and remained popular throughout the 1970s.

Song

Style 
"Prisencolinensinainciusol" has been described as varying music genres including Europop, house music, disco, hip hop and funk. Celentano, however, did not have these styles in mind when writing the song. He composed "Prisencolinensinainciusol" by creating a loop of four drumbeats and improvising lyrics over the top of the loop in his recording studio. The song is characterised by an E flat groove in the drum and bass guitar and riff in the horn section.Between the drum loop and the looped horns, not to mention the conversational improvisational "freestyle" flow of the lyrics and the chanting chorus, the song has many elements that predate hip hop, elements later found in hip hop in the mid 80s and 90s respectively.

Lyrics and language 
The song is intended to sound to its Italian audience as if it is sung in English spoken with an American accent, however the lyrics are deliberately unintelligible gibberish with the exception of the words "all right". Andrew Khan, writing in The Guardian, describes the sound as reminiscent of Bob Dylan's output from the 1980s.

Celentano's intention with the song was not to create a humorous novelty song but to explore communication barriers. The intent was to demonstrate how English sounds to people who do not understand the language proficiently. "Ever since I started singing, I was very influenced by American music and everything Americans did. So at a certain point, because I like American slang—which, for a singer, is much easier to sing than Italian—I thought that I would write a song which would only have as its theme the inability to communicate. And to do this, I had to write a song where the lyrics didn't mean anything."

Releases and versions
The original version of the track was released as a single on 3 November 1972, and appeared on Celentano's album Nostalrock the following year. For its UK release, the single was given the simpler title of "The Language of Love (Prisencol…)". The song appeared on the 2008 dance compilation album Poplife Presents: Poplife Sucks. Celentano later recorded a version with real Italian lyrics; this version, released on his 1994 album Quel Punto, was named "Il Seme del Rap" and served as a hip hop parody. In 2016, Celentano released a new recording of the song (with the original lyrics); this version featured the music of Benny Benassi and vocals from Mina.

Celentano performed the song at least twice on Italian television. In the fourth episode of the 1974 variety series Milleluci, he dances with Raffaella Carrà, who lip-syncs to Mori's vocals. In an episode of Formula Due, a TV show hosted by Loretta Goggi, the song appears in a comedy sketch in which he portrays a teacher. Video clips of both performances, both separate and edited together, began to appear on YouTube in the late 2000s. It became something of an Internet meme, and in 2009 it was posted to Boing Boing, and subsequently saw renewed interest in the Italian media. It was the subject of a 2012 'All Things Considered' (NPR) segment, for which Celentano was interviewed.

In 1974, British stand-up comedian and actor Mike Reid released an 'English language' version of the song, re-titled 'Freezin' Cold in 89 Twoso', for which the lyric was 'translated' into authentic English words which, while still nonsensical, approximated the sounds of Celentano's original mock-English words.

In 1992, remixes of the song by Molella and Fargetta were released on CD Single, along with the original version, to promote the compilation Superbest. An interpretation of part of the song by French actor José Garcia appeared in the 2002 film Quelqu'un de bien; a full version of this interpretation was released as a single with the title "Prisencoli". In 2008, Italian singer Bugo covered the song, which he played on tour around Italy. A remix by the Spanish DJ duo Los Massieras was released in 2010 under the title "Allrighty".

In 2017, the dancer Roberto Bolle appeared in an electronic dance remix video of the song by the Italian singer Mina and Celentano. The two previously recorded the album Mina Celentano.

In September 2017, the American rock group Tub Ring released an album called A Choice of Catastrophes, which includes a cover of "Prisencolinensinainciusol".

In 2017, the song was included in the soundtrack of "The Law of Vacant Places", the first episode of the third season of the FX television series Fargo, over Ray Stussy and Nikki Swango participating in a bridge tournament.

In 2018, the song was included in the soundtrack of "Lone Star", the second episode of the FX television series Trust. The song was incorporated into Rush Limbaugh's radio show as one of the revolving bumper music intros, where Limbaugh asserts learning about it from his memory of details that match the TV show.

In 2019 comedian James Adomian covered the song on his podcast The Underculture, using his impression of psychoanalyst and philosopher Slavoj Žižek.

In 2021, a cover of "Prisencolinensinainciusol", sung by the Italian singer Madame, was featured on the third evening of the Sanremo Music Festival 2021. Also in 2021, Celentano's recording was used in North American TV commercials for Captain Morgan rum.

Track listing
7" single – BF 70026
 "Prisencolinensinainciusol" (Adriano Celentano) – 3:54
 "Disc Jockey" (Luciano Beretta, Adriano Celentano, Miki Del Prete) – 4:54

Charts

Weekly charts

Year-end charts

See also
Grammelot

Nonsense verse
Nonsense song

Similar songs
In the movie Modern Times, The Tramp (Charlie Chaplin) improvises a song in gibberish on the notes of Léo Daniderff's "Je cherche après Titine".
In the movie La Dolce Vita, Celentano performs Little Richard's "Ready Teddy", singing mostly unintelligible sounds.
Ameno The lyrics, by Guy Protheroe, are written in Pseudo-Latin, i.e. sounding like Latin but are in fact deliberately devoid of any exact meaning

References

External links
Sasha Frere-Jones blog at newyorker.com (28 April 2008)
Language Log post (25 October 2009) with videos
The Deep Roots of an Italian Song That Sounds Like English—But Is Just Nonsense

1972 singles
Adriano Celentano songs
Gibberish language
Songs about language
Italian songs 
Novelty songs
Experimental pop songs